Thomas Cregg Scherrer (born July 20, 1970) is an American professional golfer.

Scherrer was born in Syracuse, New York and grew up in Skaneateles, New York. He attended the University of North Carolina at Chapel Hill. He played for the American team in the 1991 Walker Cup. He lost to Justin Leonard in the finals of the 1992 U.S. Amateur.

Scherrer turned professional in 1992, and has spent a relatively equal amount of time on the PGA Tour and Nationwide Tour. He was a member of the PGA Tour in 1996, 1999–2003, and in 2008; he played on the Nationwide Tour from 1994–1995, 1997–1998, 2004–2007 and in 2009. He has one PGA Tour victory, the 2000 Kemper Insurance Open and three Nationwide Tour wins.

Amateur wins (1)
1990 North and South Amateur

Professional wins (4)

PGA Tour wins (1)

Nationwide Tour wins (3)

*Note: The 1998 Nike Upstate Classic was shortened to 54 holes due to rain.

Nationwide Tour playoff record (1–4)

Results in major championships

CUT = missed the half-way cut
WD  = withdrew from tournament
"T" = tied

Results in The Players Championship

CUT = missed the halfway cut

Results in World Golf Championships

1Cancelled due to 9/11

QF, R16, R32, R64 = Round in which player lost in match play
NT = No tournament

U.S. national team appearances
Amateur
Walker Cup: 1991 (winners)

See also
1995 Nike Tour graduates
1998 Nike Tour graduates
2007 Nationwide Tour graduates

References

External links

American male golfers
North Carolina Tar Heels men's golfers
PGA Tour golfers
Korn Ferry Tour graduates
Golfers from New York (state)
Sportspeople from Syracuse, New York
People from Skaneateles, New York
Golfers from Raleigh, North Carolina
1970 births
Living people